Gandang Dewata National Park is located at Mamasa Regency, West Sulawesi, Indonesia.

Mount Gandang Dewata (3304 meters) is one of the highest mountains located in the western part of Sulawesi (Quarlesi mountains) and the second highest mountain in Sulawesi after Mount Latimojong (3140 meters) located in Enrekang district. Mount Gandang Dewata is in the district of Mamasa bordering Mamuju regency which has a height of 3074 meters from the sea surface. The mountain range covers an area of 214,201 hectares, This mountain is considered sacred by the local community.

LIPI research in 2013 shows that Gandang Dewata is a habitat for a number of endemic bird species, and even found a number of new species that need to be maintained. In an effort to protect the area with a high degree of diversity, authenticity and uniqueness the Ministry of Environment and Forestry declared ( number 773 / MENLHK / SETJEN / PLA.2 / 10/2016 on 3 October 2016) 189.208,17 hectares of the mountain as 53rd national park  of Indonesia in 2016.

Etymology
Gandang Dewata comes from two words, namely Gandang which means drums and Dewata which means gods. Peak of Gandang Dewata, Tanete looks like a large stone round-shaped like a giant drum from a distance. On certain days, people at the foot of the mountain often hear the roar that is the voice of the giant drum. This myth is preserved to this day, so most locals regard this mountain as a mystical mountain. Therefore, any nature activists who intend to climb to this mountain are required to maintain the behavior and he said during the climb to be able to avoid the catastrophe.

References

External links
 Gandang Dewata National Park

National parks of Indonesia
Sulawesi
2016 establishments in Indonesia
Geography of West Sulawesi